Ryan Felix Mayne Garry (born 29 September 1983) is an English former professional footballer who played as a defender and could also operate as a midfielder for Arsenal and AFC Bournemouth. He is currently head coach of the England U17s.

Club career

Arsenal
Born in Hornchurch, London, Garry joined Arsenal in 1999 and progressed through their youth academy, winning the FA Youth Cup in 2001. He signed a professional contract with Arsenal on 2 July 2001, and his first team debut came against Sunderland on 6 November 2002 in the League Cup. He made his first starting appearance on 7 May 2003 against Southampton, playing 90 minutes in a 6–1 win which saw hat-tricks from Robert Pires and Jermaine Pennant, the first match of Arsenal's 49-game unbeaten run. However, this proved to be his only league appearance as he was then hit by long-term injury (shin splints) and spent most of the next four seasons on the sidelines.

AFC Bournemouth
He was released by Arsenal at the end of the 2006–07 season, after which he joined AFC Bournemouth on a contract until January 2008 following a trial. He signed a contract extension in January 2008, which would keep him at the club until the end of the 2007–08 season. He signed a new contract in June.

Garry made his debut for Bournemouth in a 0–0 draw against Nottingham Forest on 11 August 2007. On 15 August 2009, Garry scored his first goal and the only goal in the match against Rotherham United in a 1–0 win. On 25 September 2010, Garry scored his second goal in a 2–0 win over Carlisle United and scored his third in a 1–1 draw against Sheffield Wednesday on 23 October 2010. Garry made his last appearance for Bournemouth against Walsall in a 3–0 victory before Garry suffered an injury.

In July 2011 he was forced to retire from football at the age of 27, after failing to recover from a persistent nerve-related problem in his lower leg and became first-team coach and defensive co-ordinator at Bournemouth. He was released again 10 months later as part of a backroom reshuffle by new manager Paul Groves.

Coaching career
On 27 September 2021, Garry was appointed as head coach of the England U18s following coaching spells with Bournemouth, Nike Academy and Arsenal. On 16 August 2022, Garry was appointed as head coach of the England U17s.

Honours
Arsenal
FA Youth Cup: 2000–01

References

External links

1983 births
Living people
Footballers from Hornchurch
English footballers
England youth international footballers
Association football defenders
Arsenal F.C. players
AFC Bournemouth players
Premier League players
English Football League players
Black British sportspeople
AFC Bournemouth non-playing staff
Arsenal F.C. non-playing staff
Association football coaches